Decamps is a French surname. Notable people with the surname include:

Alexandre-Gabriel Decamps (1803–1860), French painter
Derek Decamps (born 1985), French footballer
Paul Decamps (1884–1915), French rugby union player

See also
Roullet & Decamps, a defunct French toy company

French-language surnames